David's Psalter (original Polish title: Psalterz Dawidow) is a poetic translation into Polish of the Book of Psalms, by Jan Kochanowski, the most prominent poet of the Polish Renaissance. It was printed in 1579 in Kraków, at the Lazarus printing house.

Kochanowski, like contemporaries in Western Europe, used a Latin translation of the Book of Psalms as the basis for his translation. Well versed in the ancient classics, he combined the original's biblical spirit with the literary achievements of Greek and Latin authors. 

Kochanowski's David's Psalter won recognition from both Protestants and Catholics in Poland, and also resonated abroad, notably in the work of Moldavian Metropolitan Dosoftei. Some of Kochanowski's renderings of the Psalms are still used in Polish Catholic masses.

Notes

References
 Michael J. Mikoś, Polish Literature from the Middle Ages to the End of the Eighteenth Century: a Bilingual Anthology, Warsaw, Constans, 1999.
 Czesław Miłosz, The History of Polish Literature, 2nd ed., Berkeley, University of California Press, 1983.

1579 works
1579 in the Polish–Lithuanian Commonwealth
Polish poems
Psalters
Works by Jan Kochanowski